USCGC Sea Otter (WPB-87362) is the 61st cutter in the United States Coast Guard's successful .

Design

The  Sea Otter incorporates several features not present in the Coast Guard's earlier cutters.  The class are equipped with a stern launching ramp, that allows the vessel to deploy or retrieve it waterjet propelled pursuit boat, without having to stop.  The Coast Guard had a new initiative, when the class was designed, that all its cutters, even the smallest, like the Marine Protector, should be able to accommodate mixed sex crews.

The class is designed for missions lasting up to three days. Marine Protector cutters are lightly armed, with all but the four owned by the US Navy mounting a main armament of a pair of crew-served fifty caliber Browning machine guns, on either side of their foredecks.

Cutters like Sea Otter are assigned to perform search and rescue, intercept drug smugglers and people smugglers, provide a front line response to disasters, and perform routine constabulary duties.

Operational history

On March 11, 2015, Sea Otter helped intercept a small boat, carrying over 1.3 tons of marijuana.

References

External links

Sea Otter
2005 ships
Ships built in Lockport, Louisiana